Selman Akbulut (born 1949) is a Turkish mathematician, specializing in research in topology, and geometry. He was a professor at Michigan State University until February 2020.

Career
In 1975 he earned his Ph.D. from the University of California, Berkeley as a student of Robion Kirby. In topology, he has worked on handlebody theory, low-dimensional manifolds, symplectic topology, G2 manifolds. In the topology of real-algebraic sets, he and Henry C. King proved that every compact piecewise-linear manifold is a real-algebraic set; they discovered new topological invariants of real-algebraic sets.

He was a visiting scholar several times at the Institute for Advanced Study (in 1975-76, 1980–81, 2002, and 2005).

On February 14, 2020, Akbulut was removed from his tenured position at MSU by the Board of Trustees, after complaints regarding his teaching attendance and communications with colleagues.

Contributions
He has developed 4-dimensional handlebody techniques, settling conjectures and solving problems about 4-manifolds, such as a conjecture of Christopher Zeeman, the Harer–Kas–Kirby conjecture, a problem of Martin Scharlemann, and problems of Sylvain Cappell and Julius Shaneson.
He constructed an exotic compact 4-manifold (with boundary) from which he discovered "Akbulut corks". 

His most recent results concern the  4-dimensional smooth Poincaré conjecture.  He has supervised 14 Ph.D students as of 2019. He has more than 100 papers and three books published, and several books edited.

Notes

External links

Akbulut's homepage
Akbulut's papers at ArXiv
Akbulut-King invariants
Real algebraic geometry
Akbulut cork

20th-century Turkish mathematicians
21st-century  Turkish mathematicians
Academic scandals
Topologists
University of California, Berkeley alumni
Institute for Advanced Study visiting scholars
Living people
1949 births